The O'Neill World Cup of Surfing is a prestigious event in professional surfing held annually at Pūpūkea (Sunset Beach) on Oahu in Hawaii.

The event attracts hundreds of elite surfers from around the world, and is known for its huge waves. It is the second tournament in the Triple Crown of Surfing.

History
The first competition was held in 1975. Of the 22 surfers who have won the event, 7 went on to become world champions. This competition is the final stop of the 2010 Association of Surfing Professional Tour, and the ASPW Tour as well. Top performers of the event share a prize money that varies from year to year, along with points which go to the Triple Crown competition.

Brazil's Raoni Monteiro, 28, became the first South American male in 20 years to win the O'Neill World Cup of Surfing at Sunset Beach for 2010. Fabio Gouveria from South America won the title in 1991. Tyler Wright from Australia has won the Women's Cup twice, once when she was 16, and once when she was 19

In 2005, Jake Paterson from Australia won his second O’Neill World Cup of Surfing title.  In 2006, native Hawaiian resident, Makuakai Rothman won the O’Neill World Cup of Surfing, and took home $125,000 in prize money.  In 2009, the winner of O’Neill event received $20,000, and the most consistent performer across all three Van's events received a $50,000 bonus.

Vans Triple Crown of Surfing 
The O’Neill World Cup of Surfing is presented by Rockstar Energy Drink and is the second jewel of the Vans Triple Crown of Surfing.

The $740,000 Vans Triple Crown of Surfing consists of three different competitions held in Hawaii. They the Hawaiian Pro at Haleiwa Ali'i Beach Park, Nov. 12–24, the O'Neill World Cup of Surfing at Sunset Beach, Nov.25-Dec.6, Billabong Pipeline Masters (men),  at the Banzai Pipeline, Dec. 8-20 and Billabong Pro Maui (women), Honolulu Bay, Maui, Dec. 8-20 (WCT).

Not only do the winners receive up to $740,000 in prize money, but both the men's and women's Vans Triple Crown champions will receive a limited edition $25,000 Chevy Colorado truck. The men's champion will also receive a custom $10,000 Nixon watch.

The Vans Triple Crown of Surfing is considered to be a surfer's ultimate test. Each competition offers different challenges. CJ Hobgood from the US, scored highest in the men's O’Neil World Cup of Surfing in 2008.

The Vans Triple Crown of Surfing is made possible through the support of Op, Roxy, O’Neill, Rip Curl, Billabong, Surfing, Oahu's Turtle Bay Beach Resort, Hawaiian Airlines, G-Shock, the Honolulu Star-Bulletin, Fox Sports Net and Road Runner High Speed Online.

Sunset Beach Plays a Vital Role in Women's Surfing History 

Laura Blears changed the face of professional female surfing by competing in the all-male  Smirnoff Pro competition in 1974 at Sunset Beach, Hawaii.  After her appearance in Competition, women became a normal feature the competitions cumulating in Hawaii.

In 2010, Sunset Beach plays a vital role in women's professional surfing history when O’Neill sponsored the first elite women's World Tour Event.  This event was the second jewel of the Vans Triple Crown of Surfing. The O’Neill Women's World cup of Surfing competition took place at Sunset Beach, Hawaii, November 24-December 6 in 2010, and continues to take place year after year during that same time at Sunset Beach Hawaii.  It is the next-to-last contest of the women's Championship Tour.

Randy Rarick is the executive director of the Vans Triple Crown of Surfing. He is extremely excited about the O’Neill Women's World Cup of Surfing event at Sunset Beach, and is even more excited about the future of women's surfing. The two surfers, Gilmore and Parkinson lead the Vans Triple Crown Title Race. The winning female athlete would take home $100,000 is prize money.  The event determined the top 4 women for the final pipe showdown. After the event, the 2011 World Tour was decided in Sunset

Women's 2010 Results 

Heat # 1 Women's Final

2010 Women's Wave Statistics 
The O'Neill Women's World Cup of Surfing attracts elite female surfers from around the world.  The competition is known for its big waves, and is the ultimate test. The competition takes days, so the conditions vary from day to day.

Men's 2010 Results

Men's 2010 Wave Statistics

Men's Results 2007

References

External links
Event Detail
Van's Triple Crown of Surfing

Big wave surfing
Surfing competitions in Hawaii
Surfing in Hawaii
Annual events in Hawaii
Recurring sporting events established in 1975
1975 establishments in Hawaii